Matomo may refer to:

 Matomo, Mali, a rural commune
 Matomo (software), a web analytics platform

See also
 Matano or Matana, a lake in Indonesia
 Matoma (Tom Stræte Lagergren, born 1991), Norwegian DJ and record producer